The Time of Friendship is a collection of 13 works of short fiction by Paul Bowles published in 1967 by Holt, Rinehart and Winston. A number of the stories included in this volume appeared earlier "in various places during the 1950s and 1960s."
 
The short stories that appear in The Time of Friendship are among the 39 works that Bowles wrote from the late 1930s to the 1970s. Other collections published in the United States include The Delicate Prey and Other Stories (1950) and Things Gone and Still Here (1977).

His complete short fiction was published in Paul Bowles: The Collected Stories, 1939-1976 (1980) by Black Sparrow Press.

Contents
 "The Time of Friendship"
 "The Successor"
 "The Hours After Noon"
 "A Friend of the World"
 "He of the Assembly"
 "The Story of Lahcen and Idir"
 "The Wind at Beni Midar"
 "The Hyena"
 "The Garden"
 "Doña Faustina"
 "Tapiama"
 "If I Should Open My Mouth"
 "The Frozen Fields"

Critical assessment
Shortly before the publication of the collection The Time of Friendship in 1967, Bowles told interviewer Daniel Halpern that the short fiction from The Delicate Prey and Other Stories (1950) remained his favorites.

Biographer Allen Hibbard considers the stories in The Time of Friendship to be "tamer" than those in the earlier volume, and though "no less poignant", lack any effort "to extent the boundaries of what could be done with the short story." Literary critic Maureen Howard writes:

 Literary critic Daniel Stern writes:

Critic Bernard Bergonzi writes:

Style and theme
Time writes:

Footnotes

Sources 
Bowles, Paul. 2001. Paul Bowles; Collected Stories, 1939-1976. Black Sparrow Press. Santa Rosa. 2001.
Hibbard, Allen. 1993. Paul Bowles: A Study of the Short Fiction. Twayne Publishers. New York. 
Vidal, Gore. 1979. Introduction to Paul Bowles; Collected Stories, 1939-1976. Black Sparrow Press. Santa Rosa. 2001. 

1967 short story collections
American short story collections
Short story collections by Paul Bowles